Guman Mal Lodha (1926 – 22 March 2009) was the chief justice of Gauhati High Court and former member of Lok Sabha.

Born in 1926 in Didwana, Nagaur District in Rajasthan, India, Lodha graduated with BCom and LLB degrees at Jaswant College, Jodhpur. He participated in the freedom movement and was imprisoned in 1942. He joined politics and was the President of Rajasthan state unit of Jan Sangh from 1969 to 1971.

Positions held 
 1969-71		President, Jan Sangh, Rajasthan
 1972-77		Member, Rajasthan Legislative Assembly; chairman, Committee on Petitions and Committee on Delegated Legislation, Rajasthan Legislative Assembly Member, Business Advisory Committee and Panel of chairman, Rajasthan Legislative Assembly; Leader, Jan Sangh Legislature Party, Rajasthan
 1978-88		Judge, Rajasthan High Court
 1988		Chief Justice, Gauhati High Court, Guwahati
 1989		Elected to Lok Sabha (Ninth)
 1989 onwards	Member, National Executive, B.J.P.
 1989-91		Chairman, Committee on Subordinate Legislation; Member, Consultative Committee, Ministry of Law and Justice
 1990-91		Member, General Purposes Committee
 1991		Re-elected to Lok Sabha (Tenth)
 1992-94		Member, Committee on Subordinate Legislation
 1992-96		Member, Consultative Committee, Ministry of Finance
 1996		Elected to Lok Sabha (Eleventh) for the third time

Lodha had been a judge in Rajasthan High court and retired as Chief Justice of Gauhati High Court. He had also been a worker for the cause of animals and cows in India. He served as the chairman for Animal Welfare Board of India and National Commission on Cattle.

He died on 22 March 2009, in Ahmedabad (Gujarat) after suffering from cancer for five years. People for Animals (PFA) Haryana Chairman Naresh Kadyan, representative of OIPA in India, announced a "Justice Guman Mal Lodha Memorial National Award" to the former Superintendent of Faridabad Police Srikant Jadhav, IPS.

References

External links
 Guman Mal Lodha's obituary

20th-century Indian judges
India MPs 1989–1991
India MPs 1991–1996
India MPs 1996–1997
Lok Sabha members from Rajasthan
Bharatiya Janata Party politicians from Rajasthan
Bharatiya Jana Sangh politicians
People from Jodhpur
1926 births
2009 deaths
Judges of the Gauhati High Court
People from Pali district
Rajasthan MLAs 1972–1977